Marinifilum fragile is a Gram-negative, facultatively anaerobic and moderately halophilic bacterium from the genus of Marinifilum which has been isolated from tidal flat sediments from Korea.

References

External links
Type strain of Marinifilum fragile at BacDive -  the Bacterial Diversity Metadatabase

Bacteria described in 2009
Bacteroidia